Naïve dialecticism is a collection of East Asian public beliefs characterized by the acceptance of contradiction and the expectation of change in everyday life. Within cultural psychology, naïve dialecticism explains some of the cultural differences observed between those who hold dialectical beliefs and those who hold more Westernized beliefs. Individuals who hold dialectical beliefs are primarily members of Confucian influenced cultures, such as in Japan, China, and Korea. Certain researchers have shown that specific aspects of naïve dialecticism have broad implications on cognition, emotion, and behavior. As well, it is sometimes regarded as being more contextual, flexible, holistic, and dialectical as compared with Western thinking and reasoning. Dialecticism is a perceptual framework that applies to all situations and guides all actions, which is called a domain-general thinking style. Naïve dialecticism is an expansion on this research; it is a whole collection of domain-specific beliefs, meaning that there is a tendency to understand a situation in terms of these beliefs but there is variation depending on the context and individual differences.

Naïve dialecticism contains certain concepts that distinguish it from Western thinking and beliefs, specifically they have different beliefs about change and contradiction. Dialectic thinking involves treating the world as consisting of co-existing extremes or opposites (e.g. hot/cold or light/dark). As a result, they are more likely to expect change from the status quo. Dialectic thinkers also believe that the truth is always somewhere in the middle (doctrine of the mean), which differs from Western beliefs that contradictions must be reconciled because only a single truth is thought to exist

Naive dialecticism provides a framework for analysis that is halfway between a macro-level and a micro-level approach. On a macro-level, individualism and collectivism define the social differences between cultures, which influences the specific common beliefs about how the world operates. Naïve dialecticism shares this macro-level framework while also looking at individual and situation-specific differences between people (micro-approach).

Principles

The three principles of naïve dialecticism are change, contradiction, and holism, and they operate together. If the world is in constant flux, as explained by the principle of change, then there must be acceptance of contradiction because one phenomenon will inevitably become something else. The fact that understanding phenomena relies on acceptance of contradiction within and between phenomena suggests that the only way to understand it is to look at it holistically.

Change

People who are high in naïve dialecticism tend to view the world as constantly changing, especially alternating between two opposites. For example, day transforms into night, life becomes death, etc. Basic Taoist teachings suggest that knowledge and existence are in constant flux, and categorization is ineffective as nothing is ever fixed. The concept of change is situation-specific, and so those who are dialectic thinkers believe that their behaviors change depending on the context and individual differences. However, the concept of change is global in that it applies to feelings, events, objects, natural processes and any other phenomena observed in the universe. This can be contrasted to naïve aristotelianism, which follows the law of identity: If something is true than it is true, regardless of context.

Contradiction

Contradiction assumes that objects, events and states of being have coexisting opposing parts. By splitting or differentiating something to better understand its component parts, one is simply emphasizing the interaction between the contradicting parts.

The doctrine of the mean is the belief that the truth is always in the middle, between extreme viewpoints. This belief is consistent with naïve dialecticism and is based on the values of balance and harmony. This contrasts Western beliefs that more often align with the law of non-contradiction, which maintains that a statement cannot be both true and false, and the law of the excluded middle, which suggests that a statement is either true or false. Westerners tend to pick a side, even to the point of changing their beliefs about the pros that the losing side offers. Changing one's beliefs such that they will be consistent with one's choice is called cognitive dissonance.

Holism

Holism is the belief that everything is interconnected and relational, and understanding something requires understanding its relationships and context. A primary part of holism is that personal growth requires physical and spiritual growth, and is not independent of the environment within which the growth occurs. In this tradition there is no dichotomy of "self" and "other".

Naïve dialecticism research has arisen primarily out of the holistic/analytic tradition of cultural research, which compares cultures on the basis of cognitive styles. These cognitive styles are general ways of interpretation that are adopted, and often similar within a culture. Holism is a characteristic that is generally applied to East Asian cultures, while Western cultures are more often characterized by analytic thinking. This means that Westerners tend to deconstruct something into parts to understand it, while East Asians tend to look at the entire phenomena as a whole and attempt to understand the relationships that bind each facet to every other and to the phenomena as a whole.

Historical roots: Three systems of thought

In East Asian countries, lay beliefs predominantly derive from Taoism, Confucianism, and Buddhism. Taoism guides cognitive beliefs about the physical world, Confucianism guides state decisions and Buddhism guides development of the mind and spirit.

Taoism

 
Naïve dialecticism is a lay rendition of Taoism. Taoism is not a religion, but rather a system of beliefs regarding thinking and reasoning or, generally, for understanding how the world works. Unlike the traditions of Confucianism or Buddhism, Taoism did not begin from a community following the teachings of a leader, and therefore there is no original orthodoxy or orthopraxy that provide a standard for the Taoist tradition. Taoism teachings suggest that most people do not live a fulfilling life, as they do not strive for self-cultivation to enhance their experiential awareness. Tao roughly translated means "the way", although there are many definitions and none accurately capture the meaning of Tao.

Basic concepts
 Non-duality: the concept that matter and spirit are one, and having one is necessary to know the other. Non-duality is consistent with the principle of contradiction, a fundamental concept in naïve dialecticism.
 Two-poles: the basic concept of opposites coexisting and complementing one another is evident in the yin/yang symbol. Yin, the negative, passive, feminine side, must interact with yang, the positive, active, masculine side.  Without one the other cannot exist.
 Perpetual change: this concept suggests that the universe is in a perpetual cycle, consistent with the principle of change in naïve dialecticism.
 Three Treasures: Ching (essence), chi (vitality) and shen (spirit) are the fundamental components of energy and exist at every level of the universe. This is consistent with the concept of holism in naïve dialecticism.
 Five Elements: According to the Taoist tradition there are five basic elements making up the universe: metal, wood, fire, water and earth. Understanding how each contributes and influences one another is essential to the belief of holism.
 Non-action (Wu wei): this concept refers to flexibility and spontaneity of one's actions.

Confucianism 

The Confucian tradition is agnostic; it focuses on living a moral life for the sake of itself, without discussing what comes before or after. Most of Confucius' teachings stem from the Analects, a series of correspondences between Confucius and his students. It generally informed citizens of their social roles within interpersonal relationships and how they should act morally and politically. For example, a young man was expected to pursue education and economic welfare for the betterment of his family, which relates to the importance of filial piety. This emphasis on family relations and interdependence reflects the principle of holism.

Buddhism

Originally from India, the tradition of Buddhism was introduced to Chinese culture during the Han dynasty. Since it was a later player in Chinese culture, Buddhism was unique from the indigenous traditions of Taoism and Confucianism in that the Chinese interpreted the Buddhist tradition to integrate it into these pre-existing cultural systems. The successful union of Buddhism into Chinese culture reflects the integrative and holistic nature of both. Buddhist ideas filled in many of the blanks that Taoism and Confucianism did not address. For example, Buddhism introduced the ideas of karma and rebirth. Buddhism brought a strong position on death, and filial piety was softened by Buddhist ideas of equality between all people.

Cultural products

The principles of naïve dialecticism are apparent in cultural products. For example, in the yin/yang symbol, there is perpetual motion from black to white indicating that the world is in constant flux. The black and white dots represent contradiction; not only can opposites co-exist, they could not exist without one another. The values of balance and harmony are represented by the symmetry of the symbol, and the cognitive style of holism by the outer circle representing context.

The Yin/Yang symbol is present in many well known pieces of art, as well as other symbols of Taoism and naive dialectic beliefs. The famous woodblock print "The Great Wave off Kanagawa" by Japanese artist Hokusai depicts a large wave that a writer describes as a "yin yang of empty space beneath the mountain... The violent Yang of nature is overcome by the yin of the confidence of these experienced fishermen" (Andreas Ramos). This follows the principle of contradiction, which states that events and states of being have coexisting opposing parts.

The following story demonstrates contradiction and change, and the idea that what starts off as a blessing may actually end up a curse and vice versa. This way of thinking is consistent with naïve dialecticism, and as a cultural product from ancient times it gives a glimpse into the roots of traditional East Asian thought.

Alternative comparisons

Individualism vs collectivism
The first dimension created to measure cultural differences was individualism-collectivism, which was built with the intention of avoiding one-sided comparisons of "us" vs "them". This way of categorizing people has been used for years to explain the differences seen between people in Western vs. Eastern countries, for example what the common beliefs and goals of a culture are. From this perspective, Westerners have made claims that "the Japanese lacked individuality," and Easterners have claimed that Western countries are "self-centered" or "self-serving". Recent research has shown that this viewpoint does not adequately explain cross-cultural differences and is unsupported by empirical research. Researchers have now shown that this common view of an individual-collective difference between cultures has relied too heavily on casual observations to be accurate. Likewise that converse observations, as well as some historical events, have proven that this viewpoint is outdated and, overall, unsupported.

On the other hand, the concept of naïve dialecticism is an alternative to the outdated use of individualism-collectivism to explain cultural differences between Western and Eastern countries. Differences seen in the goals and beliefs of East-Asian cultures may be due to the values that they hold as a result of naive dialecticism. For instance, the principle of holism dictates that personal growth is dependent on the environment within which the growth occurs, and that the "self" and the "other" are one. Perhaps this belief is what we once called collectivism, but holism is much more central and universal than the pure concept of collectivism.

Interdependence vs. independence

The interdependence/independence viewpoint for making cultural comparisons is focused on the way people view themselves in relation to others and the world around them. Interdependent cultures tend to define who they are by their in-group relations, whereas independent cultures tend to separate their identities from one another or from the wider groups they may associate with. Generally, Westerners hold autonomy at high value, and maintaining individual integrity is essential for one's self-conception. The distinction between self and group is much more blurred in collectivist cultures. In accordance with social expectations, similarity to the social group and adoption of their organizational scheme and values is characteristic of interpersonal cultures. Modesty of one's achievements is preferred in collectivists because they are motivated to bolster the group, not their own esteem as seen in individualists.

This can have an interesting interplay with naïve dialecticism. For example, although East Asians are generally more interpersonal, and thus may be expected to favor their in-group, they are also dialectical and understand things as balanced in contradiction. East Asians actually have a more negative view of their own in-groups compared to European Americans, simply because they consider both positive and negative aspects rather than emphasizing the positives only. This is a good example of how flexible naïve dialecticism can be when competing with other cultural tendencies.

See also
Dialetheism
Heraclitus
Law of thought

References

Cross-cultural psychology
Taoist philosophy
Buddhist philosophy
Confucianism
Chinese philosophy